Vidar (also Romanized as Vīdar) is a village in Alvir Rural District, Kharqan District, Zarandieh County, Markazi Province, Iran. At the 2006 census, its population was 238, in 84 families.

The people of village are Tat and they speak Vidari Tati.

References 

Populated places in Zarandieh County